The 1972 Formula One season was the 26th season of the FIA's Formula One motor racing. It featured the 23rd World Championship of Drivers, the 15th International Cup for F1 Manufacturers and numerous non-championship Formula One races. The World Championship season commenced on 23 January and ended on 8 October after twelve races.

For 1972 Team Lotus focused again on the type 72 chassis. Imperial Tobacco continued its sponsorship of the team under its new John Player Special brand. The cars, now often referred to as 'JPS', were fielded in a new black and gold livery. Lotus took the championship by surprise in 1972 with 25-year-old Brazilian driver Emerson Fittipaldi who became the youngest World Champion at that point. Stewart came second in the championship.

This was the first year where all the races were run on circuits with safety features on them, and considerable progress had been made since 1968, the last year where all races were run on circuits with no safety features.

The British Racing Motors (BRM) team took its last victory when Jean-Pierre Beltoise won the rain-affected 1972 Monaco Grand Prix in a BRM P160.

The Dutch Grand Prix was cancelled this year because of safety arrangements that were not completed for the race. It was supposed to be held between the Belgian and French Grand Prix's at the usual location, Zandvoort. Also, a second American motor race called the United States Grand Prix West, originally supposed to be held in April at the Ontario Motor Speedway near Los Angeles, was cancelled. The Mexican Grand Prix was scheduled to be the last race of the season, but it was cancelled after local interest dissipated after the death of Pedro Rodríguez.

Drivers and constructors

Calendar

Calendar changes 
The Argentine Grand Prix returned to the calendar in 1972, It was the first Formula One race in Argentina since 1960, the Autódromo Oscar Alfredo Gálvez would be used again and was held on 23 January.

The Spanish Grand Prix was moved from Montjuïc to Jarama, in keeping with the event-sharing arrangement between the two circuits.

The Belgian Grand Prix returned to the calendar for 1972, the 1971 race was cancelled because of the failure to bring Circuit de Spa-Francorchamps up to mandatory safety standards. The 1972 race was held at the Nivelles-Baulers circuit.

The French Grand Prix was moved from Circuit Paul Ricard to the Charade Circuit.

The British Grand Prix was moved from Silverstone to Brands Hatch, in keeping with the event-sharing arrangement between the two circuits.

The Canadian Grand Prix was supposed to be held at Circuit Mont-Tremblant was due to host the race in rotation with Mosport Park but the Mont-Tremblant circuit had safety concerns regarding the bitter winters seriously affecting the track surface and a dispute with the local racing authorities there in 1972. Mosport would host the race in 1972 on its intended date.

The United States Grand Prix West was originally scheduled for 9 April at the Ontario Motor Speedway road course in southern California near Los Angeles but was cancelled due to the FIA's insistence on circuits holding a test event first.

The Dutch Grand Prix was originally scheduled for 18 June but was cancelled because of safety upgrades that were not completed at the Zandvoort Circuit in time for the race due to lack of funds.

The Mexican Grand Prix was originally scheduled for 22 October but was cancelled as interest waned following the death of Pedro Rodríguez in a sportscar crash in July 1971.

Season Review

Race 1: Argentina
Formula One returned to Argentina in January for the first time since 1960. The short No.9 arena configuration of the Buenos Aires city autodrome was used, and Argentine Carlos Reutemann, in his first ever F1 race, took pole position in a Brabham-Ford/Cosworth. Defending World Champion Jackie Stewart of the UK won in a Tyrrell-Ford/Cosworth.

Race 2: South Africa
The South African Grand Prix took place at the Kyalami circuit near Johannesburg in March. Denny Hulme won the race in a McLaren-Ford/Cosworth, which was McLaren's first F1 victory since 1969.

Race 3: Spain
With the cancellation of the United States Grand Prix West at the Ontario Motor Speedway near Los Angeles, Formula One started its 4-month European tour in Spain at the Jarama circuit near Madrid. The Lotus 72, improved after suspension revisions to the chassis to make the car better suited to slick tires, won in the hands of Brazilian Emerson Fittipaldi, in only his second F1 race.

Race 4: Monaco
The Monaco Grand Prix in 1972 was run in extremely wet conditions. The circuit had been changed to move the pits from the start-finish line to the harbour straight, though they were moved back to their original location the following year. Frenchman Jean-Pierre Beltoise won his only championship F1 race.

Race 5: Belgium
The Belgian Grand Prix took place at the Nivelles circuit just outside Brussels, replacing the Spa-Francorchamps circuit because of safety concerns. Fittipaldi won again in his John Player Lotus 72D.

Race 6: France
There was a four-week break between Grands Prix as the Dutch Grand Prix was cancelled due to safety issues with the Zandvoort circuit. The French Grand Prix was run at the 5.1 mile Charade circuit, consisting of closed-off public roads located in hills surrounding an extinct volcano above Clermont-Ferrand. The circuit's twisty, undulating and sometimes fast nature provided a considerable challenge, and the circuit had been lined with more Armco and had a few more safety features. New Zealander Chris Amon took pole with his new Matra MS120D, ahead of his countryman Denny Hulme in a McLaren. Amon led until suffering a puncture, which dropped him to third place, behind Stewart and Fittipaldi – the former returning from illness after missing the previous race in Belgium. Austrian Helmut Marko was hit and blinded in his left eye by a rock thrown from Fittipaldi's Lotus; the injury ended his racing career. The Charade circuit was never used again for F1, with subsequently planned events being cancelled over safety concerns.

Race 7: Great Britain
The British Grand Prix was at Brands Hatch in 1972, and Jacky Ickx in a Ferrari took pole ahead of Fittipaldi and Stewart. Fittipaldi won the race, 4.1 seconds ahead of Stewart.

Race 8: West Germany
The German Grand Prix was held at the 14.2 mile (22.8 km) Nürburgring Nordschleife – the longest, most demanding and most difficult circuit of the year for Formula One. The race distance was extended from 12 to 14 laps, and Jacky Ickx took pole with a record-breaking time of 7 minutes and 7 seconds, ahead of Stewart, Fittipaldi, Swede Ronnie Peterson in a March and Stewart's teammate Francois Cevert in a Tyrrell-Ford/Cosworth. Ickx went on to dominate the race – he set fastest lap and led from start to finish. Fittipaldi retired with a seized gearbox, and Stewart and Clay Regazzoni in a Ferrari battled until they collided on the last lap at the Hatzenbach. Stewart went off and crashed, but Regazzoni was able to finish behind his teammate Ickx to make it a Ferrari 1–2.

Race 9: Austria
The Austrian Grand Prix was held at the fastest circuit of the year – the Österreichring in the Styrian mountains. Stewart and Fittipaldi fought for the lead early on, but Stewart, with a new model Tyrrell-Ford/Cosworth 005, eventually fell back and finished 7th, while Fittipaldi won ahead of Denny Hulme and American Peter Revson.

Race 10: Italy
The European season concluded four weeks after Austria at the Italian Grand Prix at Monza. The Monza autodrome had been slowed compared to previous years by chicanes fitted just after the pit straight and at what was the flat-out Vialone left hander. Fittipaldi's win in Austria and Stewart's failure to score points meant that Fittipaldi could become World Champion at the race, and after Stewart retired at the start with gearbox failure, he was able to take the win and his first Drivers' Championship. At the age of 25, he was the youngest-ever World Champion, a record not beaten until 2005.

Race 11: Canada
The Formula One season traditionally concluded in North America, and the first of two North American rounds was in Canada, at the Mosport Park circuit near Toronto. The race was originally supposed to be held at the Circuit Mont-Tremblant in northern Quebec, but a dispute with the local authorities saw the race moved back to Mosport, which had received safety upgrades after a fatal accident during a Formula Ford race during the previous year's event. Jackie Stewart won the race from McLaren drivers Revson and Hulme.

Race 12: United States
Two weeks after Canada, the 12th and last race of the 1972 Formula One season was held at Watkins Glen International circuit in New York State. Stewart won again ahead of his teammate Cevert, in a race that had 31 cars and drivers start the race.

Results and standings

Grands Prix

World Drivers' Championship standings

Points for the 1972 World Championship of Drivers were awarded on a 9–6–4–3–2–1 basis to the top six finishers in each race. For classification, only the best five results from the first half of the season and the best five results from the second half of the season could be retained.

International Cup for F1 Manufacturers standings

Points for the 1972 International Cup for F1 Manufacturers were awarded on a 9–6–4–3–2–1 basis to the top six finishers in each race. Only the best placed car from each manufacturer was eligible to score points. For classification, only the best five results from the first half of the season and the best five results from the second half of the season could be retained.

Bold results counted to championship totals.

Non-championship races
Other Formula One races were also held in 1972, which did not count towards the World Championship.

Notes

References

External links
 1972 World Championship race results and images at f1-facts.com

Formula One seasons